The Blackbird (also nicknamed X-Jet) is a fictional aircraft appearing in American comic books published by Marvel Comics. The plane is depicted as being used by the superhero team the X-Men. There have been several incarnations of this craft over the years, with Cyclops and Storm as the main pilots.

Fictional history
When the X-Men were introduced, they traveled in Professor Xavier's private jet and helicopter: advanced but fairly conventional aircraft with remote autopilots (i.e. the Professor flew them from home). When the series resumed in 1975, the X-Men flew a strato-jet that resembled a larger version of the Lockheed SR-71 "Blackbird" spy plane (hence the name), modified to carry several passengers and for Vertical Take-Off and Landing (VTOL). Some writers have referred to this design as the "SR-73", "SR-77", or the "SR-70"; it is canon in most plotlines of the Marvel Universe, including X-Men: Evolution, whose first episode sees Scott call it the SR-77. The original X-Men Blackbird has been destroyed and rebuilt numerous times in the course of the team's many adventures. The later versions incorporated technology created by the mutant inventor Forge, as well as alien (Shi'ar) technology, including weapons, holographic active camouflage, and engines capable of hypersonic speeds. One version of the Blackbird had an experimental cockpit windshield infused with traces of the same ruby quartz material used in Cyclops' visor, allowing him to project and amplify his optic blasts.

Ultimate X-Jet

In the Ultimate X-Men series, the X-Men seemingly have several aircraft, including one that resembles a B-2 Spirit stealth bomber (this craft is referred to in issue #70 as the "X-Wing"). One of the airplanes has been referred to casually as the "Blackbird" because of its resemblance to the SR-71.

In other media

Television
 The Blackbird appeared in X-Men: Pryde of the X-Men and frequently in the X-Men animated television series.
 The X-Jet (along with a helicopter) appeared in the more recent animated series X-Men: Evolution.
 The Blackbird also appeared frequently in the animated series Wolverine and the X-Men.
 The Blackbird is also featured in Marvel Anime.

Video games
 The Blackbird is the setting of Storm's stage in the arcade and console-imported game X-Men: Children of the Atom. The players fight on top of the Blackbird, which is parked on top of an aircraft carrier itself. It also appears again in the arcade and console-imported game X-Men vs. Street Fighter. The players must once again fight on top of the Blackbird, though this time it is not on top of an aircraft carrier, but rather getting prepared for lift-off. The stage returned in Marvel Super Heroes vs. Street Fighter. The players must once again fight on top of the Blackbird, though this time it is not ready for takeoff, but rather having recently landed.
 The X-Jet's look from the Ultimate X-Men comics was used in the games X-Men Legends and X-Men Legends II: Rise of Apocalypse. It served the purpose of taking the characters to their next location.
 The Blackbird is mentioned by Wolverine at the beginning of Deadpool when he is heard at the call-answerer saying "NO! You can't take our Blackbird for a joy ride!". Later on, the X-Men reluctantly let Deadpool pilot the Blackbird to take them and himself to Genosha, but Deadpool crashes it during landing, knocking the X-Men out.

Film
 The Blackbird is briefly featured in the first X-Men film, where it is used to bring the X-Men to Liberty Island. It played a larger role in the sequel, X2. It is first used by Jean Grey and Storm to locate Nightcrawler. It is later used to rescue Wolverine, Rogue, Pyro, and Iceman, and is then flown to Alkali Lake's dam to save captured Xavier Institute students and to foil William Stryker's plan. When they were asked to stay, Rogue and Iceman waited in the X-Jet while Pyro abandoned them to join the Brotherhood of Mutants. Rogue and Iceman fly the X-Jet to save the X-Men and the captured mutants. Jean Grey stays behind to counter the flood and sends the X-Jet to safety from the incoming wave from the broken dam. In X-Men: The Last Stand the X-jet employs stealth technology that renders it invisible. It is used to return to Alkali Lake to investigate Jean Grey's "resurrection". It is later used to carry the X-Men to the final battle on Alcatraz Island, where is disintegrated by Phoenix.
 A SR-71 Blackbird schematic layout can be seen in Tony Stark's computer screen in Iron Man, which is almost identical to the plane used in X-Men: First Class.
 In X-Men: First Class, the Blackbird (which Hank McCoy/Beast states that he designed) is almost externally identical to the SR-71, though its internal layout is very different. It is destroyed in the film's climax when a whirlwind created by Riptide causes it to crash.
 An updated version of the Blackbird (now known as the future X-Jet) was featured X-Men: Days of Future Past. In the future scenes of the film, set in 2023, the future X-Jet contains a compact version of the future Cerebro for Professor X's use, and was kept hidden in a Chinese monastery from the mutant-hunting Sentinels using Storm's fog ability. Upon their discovery, Magneto and Storm would later catapult the future X-Jet to explode on the approaching Sentinels. During the 1970s era of the film no version of the Blackbird or X-Jet is seen and the group transports aboard the Professor's private Jet, similar to the early comics.
 The Blackbird appears in the 2016 films Deadpool, its sequel utilized by Colossus and X-Men: Apocalypse where Hank starts to rebuilt it.
 In Dark Phoenix, the X-Jet is shown to go into space to rescue the Space Shuttle Endeavor which results in Jean Grey becoming a host for the Phoenix Force. After the death of Raven, Hank steals the X-Jet to search for Magneto on his island.

See also
 List of vehicles in Marvel Comics

References

X-Men